D. Lorenzo Arrazola y García (10 August 1797, in Checa, Guadalajara, Spain – 23 February 1873, in Madrid, Spain) was a Spanish lawyer, politician and statesman best known for being Prime Minister of Spain , a six term Minister of Justice and two-time President of the Supreme Court.

Early life 
García was born in Checa, a small town in Guadalajara. He was able to attend a seminary with the help of his mother's brother, mayor of a village in Benavente. There, he completed his early education, eventually graduating with a degree in theology and philosophy, during which time he became fluent in Latin. At 26, García left the seminary in order to join the military, against his uncle's wishes. He later went to Valladolid to study civil jurisprudence, becoming chair of the philosophy department and, later, rector of the university. García then went to Complutense University, where he spent a decade as a part of the faculty.

In 1829, he married Ana Micaela Guerrera. She was a native of Villanueva de Campa, where García had helped to repair the church after it set fire in 1850.

He began his political career in 1835, at age 38, seeking to be elected attorney. In 1837 was designated deputy of the courts in Valladolid, leaving behind law and teaching. His ideological principles settled as he joined the Moderate Party and the Ateneo de Madrid.

Career
In 1837 Arrazola entered his first election, becoming a member of Spain's Congress of Deputies, a seat he held until February 1841. In December 1838 he started his first of six terms as Minister of Grace and Justice.

In thanks for creating a new Criminal Code, Queen Isabella II made Arrazola a senator-for-life on 23 December 1848.

He served as the 4th Attorney General of Spain for a short period of time between April and October 1847. He was confirmed as President of the Supreme Court in 1851, a position he held until 1853 and again between 1856 and 1864.

Between 1864 and 1867 he is both Minister of Justice and Minister of Interior at interim.

|-
 

|-

|-
 

|-
 

|-
 

Lorenzo
Prime Ministers of Spain
Foreign ministers of Spain
Knights of the Golden Fleece
1797 births
1873 deaths
Moderate Party (Spain) politicians
19th-century Spanish politicians
Justice ministers of Spain
Attorneys general of Spain
Prosecutors general of Spain
Presidents of the Supreme Court of Spain